Trashed may refer to:
 Trashed (album), an album by the punk rock group Lagwagon
 "Trashed" (Black Sabbath song), 1983
 "Trashed" (Skin song), 2003
 Trashed (game show), an American television series
 Trashed (film), a 2012 film
Trashed (comic book), a 2015 comic by Derf Backderf

See also
 Trash (disambiguation)